Ecuador's first constitution as a republic was established in 1830, following the country's independence from Gran Colombia. Ecuador has had a total of twenty constitutions over the course of its history, which can be seen as a symptom of Ecuador's chronic instability.  

After several years of political crisis, the government of Rafael Correa, elected in 2006 following the dismissal of Lucio Gutiérrez by Congress, proposed a new Magna Carta for the country with the goal of stability and social development. This constitution, approved in 2008, is the last episode of Ecuador's constitutional history.

List of Constituent Assemblies of Ecuador

See also
Politics of Ecuador
2008 Constitution of Ecuador

Constitutions of Ecuador
Legal history of Ecuador
Ecuador